During his 10 year career as a strongman, Iceland's Hafþór Júlíus Björnsson established many world records, strongman records and other feats of strength across every single strongman event.

Below list is a summary of some of those records and his PRs.

Strongman 
 Deadlift –  Standard bar with figure 8 straps and single-ply suit (2020 World's Ultimate Strongman - Feats of Strength series) The Heaviest Deadlift of All-time (World Record)
 Rogue Elephant Bar Deadlift –  Elephant bar, raw with straps (2019 Arnold Strongman Classic) (World Record)
 IronMind S-Cubed Bar Deadlift –  Stiff bar, single-ply suit with straps (2017 World's Strongest Man)
 Hummer Tire Deadlift –  Raw with straps (2014 Arnold Strongman Classic)
 Silver Dollar Deadlift –  Single-ply suit with straps (2018 World's Ultimate Strongman)
 Cart Wheel Deadlift –  Raw with straps (2015 New Hampshire Highland Games)
 Car Deadlift (for reps) –  x 13 reps (2015 SCL Bulgaria) (Strongman Record)
 Axle Deadlift (for reps) –  x 6 reps (2018 Europe's Strongest Man)
 Axle Deadlift (for reps) –  x 8 reps (2017 Europe's Strongest Man)
 Axle Deadlift (for reps) –  x 10 reps (2019 Europe's Strongest Man)
 Deadlift Ladder –  6 lifts under 60 seconds (2015 Giants Live Viking Challenge) (Strongman Record)
 Deadlift Static Hold –  - 45.29 seconds (2019 World's Strongest Man)
 Circus Barbell Squat (for reps) –  x 7 reps (2019 World's Strongest Man)
 Circus Barbell Squat (for reps) –  x 12 reps (2017 World's Strongest Man)
 Barrel Squat –  x 7 reps in 27.50 seconds (2018 World's Strongest Man Group 1)
 Viking Log carry –  [5 steps] (World's Strongest Viking 2015) (World Record)
 Log press –  (2018 Europe's Strongest Man)
 Log press/ Austrian Oak (for reps) –  x 3 reps (2017 Arnold Strongman Classic)
 Log press/ Slater Log (for reps) –  x 4 reps [has achieved this feat twice] (2015 Arnold Strongman Classic) & (2016 Arnold Strongman Classic)
 Axle press –  (2017 Europe's Strongest Man)
 Apollon wheel press (for reps) –  x 4 reps (2018 Arnold Strongman Classic)
 Circus Barbell press (for reps) –  x 8 reps (2016 World's Strongest Man)
 Viking press (for reps) –  x 14 reps (2017 World's Strongest Man)
 Cyr Dumbbell press –  (2020 Arnold Strongman Classic)
 Cyr Dumbbell press (for reps) –  x 4 reps [has achieved this feat twice] (2014 Arnold Strongman Classic) & (2016 Arnold Strongman Classic)
 Circus Dumbbell press (for reps) –  x 6 reps (2016 Arnold Africa)
 Circus Dumbbell press (for reps) –  x 10 reps (2013 Força Bruta)
 Overhead medley (2 x  Circus Dumbbell and 2 x  Circus Barbell) – 28.46 seconds (2014 World's Strongest Man)
 Overhead medley ( Block,  Barbell,  Axle &  Log) – 44.52 seconds (2015 Giants Live Scandinavian Open)
 Overhead medley ( Log,  Dumbbell,  Axle &  Shield) – 46.94 seconds (2018 World's Ultimate Strongman)
 Car Walk –  (30 meter course) in 12.84 seconds (2017 Europe's Strongest Man)
 Refrigerator Carry –  with two XXXL refrigerators (20 meter course) in 19.60 seconds (2014 Guinness World Records, Italy) (World Record) 
 Super Yoke –  (40 meter course) in 21.31 seconds (2014 Europe's Strongest Man)
 Super Yoke –  (20 meter course) in 17.77 seconds (2013 World's Strongest Man)
 Super Yoke –  (20 meter course) in 17.09 seconds (2015 World's Strongest Man)
 Super Yoke –  (12 meter course) in 11.41 seconds (2013 Força Bruta)
 Super Yoke –  (15 meter course) in 19.97 seconds (2018 World's Ultimate Strongman)
 Bale Tote –  (4 meter course) in 19.84 seconds (2016 Arnold Strongman Classic)
 Bale Tote –  (4 meter course) in 28.65 seconds (2017 Arnold Strongman Classic)
 Farmer's walk –  (40 meter course) in 24.16 seconds (Raw grip) (2014 SCL Serbia) (Strongman Record)
 Farmer's walk –  in each hand (40 meter course) in 17.22 seconds (Raw grip) (2014 SCL World Finals) (Strongman Record)
 Farmer's walk –  in each hand (30 meter course) in 12.43 seconds (Raw grip) (2012 Arnold Europe)
 Wheelbarrow carry –  (20 meter course) in 17.42 seconds (Raw grip) (2015 Giants Live Viking Challenge) (Strongman Record)
 Timber carry –  (35' ramp) in 11.80 seconds (Raw grip) (2018 Arnold Strongman Classic)
 Timber carry –  (35' ramp) in 10.15 seconds (with Straps) (2015 Arnold Strongman Classic) (World Record)
 Flip & Drag –  Tyre x 4 flips & Anchor and chain drag for 30 meters - 29.06 seconds (2017 Europe's Strongest Man) (World Record)
 Tyre Flip –  Tyre x 8 flips - 26.48 seconds (2014 SCL Holland) (Strongman Record)
 Tyre Flip –  Tyre x 6 flips - 28.83 seconds (2017 World's Strongest Man)
 Tyre Drag –  Tyre in a 25m course - 24.07 seconds (2012 Arnold Strongman Classic Europe) (Strongman Record)
 Atlas Stones – 5 Stones weighing 120–200 kg (264–441 lb) in 17.54 seconds (2017 Europe's Strongest Man) (World Record)  
 Atlas Stones – 5 Stones weighing 130–186 kg (287–410 lb) in 19.46 seconds (2014 World's Strongest Man) (World Record)
 Atlas Stones – 5 Stones weighing 140–200 kg (309–441 lb) in 18.16 seconds (2016 Europe's Strongest Man) (World Record)
 Atlas Stones – 5 Stones weighing 150–210 kg (331–463 lb) in 26.80 seconds (2016 World's Strongest Man)
 Atlas Stones – 6 Stones weighing 100–200 kg (220–441 lb) in 27.05 seconds (2014 Europe's Strongest Man) (World Record)
 Atlas Stone over bar –  x 6 reps (over a 4' bar) (2013 SCL FIBO, Germany)
 Stone to Shoulder –  x 8 reps (2014 Giants Live FitX Melbourne) (Strongman Record)
 Odd Haugen tombstone to shoulder -  (2019 Arnold Strongman Classic)
 Stone Block press –  (2017 New Hampshire Highland Games) (Strongman Record)
 Natural stone lift to platform – 5 Rocks ranging from 137–170 kilograms (302–375 lb) in 25.52 seconds (2012 World's Strongest Man) (Strongman Record)
 Natural stone lift to platform – 4 Rocks ranging from 120–190 kilograms (265–419 lb) in 24.61 seconds (2016 Arnold Strongman Classic Australia) (Strongman Record)
 Natural stone lift to platform – 5 Rocks ranging from 137–212 kilograms (302–467 lb) in 50.42 seconds (Iceland's Strongest Man 2019) (World Record) 
 Loading race – 100kg Sandbag, 110kg Sandbag & 120kg Sandbag in a 10m course into different height stairs - 16.06 seconds (2013 SCL Holland) (Strongman Record)
 Loading race – 110kg Sack, 110kg Sack, 110kg Sack, 110kg Sack & 110kg Sack in a 15m course - 29.86 seconds (2015 SCL Finland) (Strongman Record)
 Loading race – 105kg Anchor, 125kg Anvil, 120kg Keg, 150kg Sandbag & 120kg Safe in a 10m course - 31.22 seconds (2018 World's Strongest Man) (Strongman Record)
 Loading race – 125kg Barrel, 125kg Barrel, 125kg Sack & 125kg Sack in a 12m course - 38.55 seconds (2014 Europe's Strongest Man) (Strongman Record)
 Loading race – 100kg Tyre, 100kg Tyre & 100kg Tyre in a sand course - 36.07 seconds (2014 World's Strongest Man) (Strongman Record)
 Medley – 125kg Barrel, 125kg Tyre, 125kg Sack & 200kg Duck walk in a 30m course - 34.59 seconds (2015 Europe's Strongest Man) (Strongman Record)
 Medley – 145kg in each hand farmer's walk & 180 kg shield carry in a 30m course - 34.75 seconds (2013 SCL Brazil) (Strongman Record)
 Medley – 160kg metal log carry & 320 kg tyre drag in a 25m course - 44.66 seconds (2013 SCL Holland) (Strongman Record)
 Medley – 350kg frame carry & 3 x 100kg sacks in a 20m course - 25.31 seconds (2014 SCL Finland) (Strongman Record)
 Medley – 2 x 110kg sacks & 310kg cart drag in a 10m course - 64.03 seconds (2017 World's Strongest Man Group 2) (Strongman Record)
 Power Stairs (3 x  Duck walks / total of 18 steps) – 27.16 seconds (2014 Battle of the North) (World Record)
 Power Stairs (3 x  Duck walks / total of 15 steps) – 35.37 seconds (2015 World's Strongest Man) 
 Power Stairs (&  Duck walks / total of 18 steps) – 68.20 seconds (2013 SCL Latvia)
 Hercules hold ( in each hand) – 55.13 seconds (2019 Europe's Strongest Man) 
 Thor's Hammer hold – 50.56 seconds (2014 Europe's Strongest Man)
 Thor's Hammer hold – 45.22 seconds (2015 Europe's Strongest Man) 
 Crucifix hold ( in each hand) – 52.15 seconds (2013 SCL FIBO, Germany)
 Front hold (Battery) – 1 minute 23.05 seconds (2014 Guinness World Records, Italy)
 Front hold (Sword) – 1 minute 0.81 seconds (2014 Giants Live Norway)
 Fingal's Fingers – 5 fingers  in 32.99 seconds (2014 World's Strongest Man Group 2)
 Norse Hammers – 3 hammers  in 52.70 seconds (2015 World's Strongest Man Group 2)
 Basque Circle –  612° rotation (2018 World's Strongest Man Group 1)
 Conan's Wheel –  1310° rotation (2015 SCL Bulgaria) (World Record)
 Conan's Wheel of Pain –  36.35 meters (119 1/4 feet) (2019 Arnold Strongman Classic)
 Arm Over Arm pull –  in a 20m course - 32.23 seconds (2014 SCL Serbia) (World Record)
 Sled pull –  harness only/ no rope in a 20m course - 26.06 seconds (2014 Giants Live Norway) (Strongman Record)
 Boat pull –  in a 25m course - 18.87 seconds (2015 SCL Norway) (Strongman Record)
 Car pull – 10 x  cars for 20 meters in 17.50 seconds (2014 Guinness World Records, Italy) (World Record)
 Truck pull –  20 meters uphill in 35.76 seconds (2011 SCL Canada) (Strongman Record)
 Truck pull –  30 meters uphill in 57.94 seconds (2011 World's Strongest Man) (Strongman Record)
 Truck pull –  20 meters in 24.34 seconds (2013 SCL Holland) (Strongman Record)
 Truck pull –  harness only/ no rope 30 meters in 40.98 seconds (2014 SCL Holland) (Strongman Record)
 Truck pull –  25 meters uphill in 40.19 seconds (2013 World's Strongest Man) (Strongman Record)
 Bus pull –  20 meters in 28.34 seconds (2014 SCL Malaysia) (Strongman Record)
 Truck pull –  12.05 meters, extra uphill (2013 SCL World Finals) (Strongman Record)
 Bus pull –  25 meters in 36.05 seconds (2018 World's Strongest Man)
 Plane pull –  24.90 meters (2016 World's Strongest Man) (Strongman Record)

Powerlifting 
WRPF (World Raw Powerlifting Federation):
 Squat (raw with wraps) –  (Thor's Powerlifting Challenge 2018)
 Bench press (raw) –  (Thor's Powerlifting Challenge 2018)
 Deadlift (raw) –  (Thor's Powerlifting Challenge 2018)
 Total –  (Thor's Powerlifting Challenge 2018)

Íslandsmót [20-23 age category]:
 Squat (raw with wraps) –  (Íslandsmót 2011)
 Bench press (raw) –  (Íslandsmót 2011)
 Deadlift (raw) –  (Íslandsmót 2011)
 Total –  (Íslandsmót 2011)

Other 
Unofficial WRs and other PRs during training:
Deadlift –  Replica Elephant bar, raw with straps (Unofficial Strongman Raw WR)
Deadlift –  x 2 reps Replica Elephant bar, raw with straps (first person in history to rep 1,000 lbs)
Deadlift –  x 3 reps Standard bar, with a single ply suit and straps (heaviest Deadlift triple of all-time)
Squat –  raw with wraps (Thor's Powerlifting Challenge 2018) This lift was given 2 red lights out of 3 for inadequate depth at the competition, however in strongman standards and according to many analysts, the depth was acceptable to consider a good squat while detailed analysts have further argued the depth was exactly identical to his previous 3 white lighted lift through superimposition techniques and implies it was human error at judging
 Squat –  raw,  raw
Squat –  x 29 reps (raw with wraps) (Unofficial WR)
 Bench press –  raw
 Incline Dumbbell press –  Dumbbells per hand x 7 reps, 6 reps, 5 reps, and 4 reps (both low incline (twice) and high incline positions), and Dumbbells per hand x 12 reps (twice) (all lifts were after picking up the Dumbbells from floor one handed and positioning them himself)
 Inch Dumbbell one hand clean (grip) –  (3 kg heavier than the original) with a 2 " (6.03 cm) diameter handle x 2 reps (one each with right and left hands) 
 Cyr Dumbbell press –  and  x 3 reps (22 kg & 5 kg heavier than the original)
 Natural Stone Shoulder – 
 Rock press – ,  and  overhead
 Atlas Stone overhead press –  x 4 reps
 Atlas Stone over 4' bar –  x 2 reps
 Atlas Stone one motion to 4' platform – 
 Power Stairs (3 x  Duck walks / total of 15 steps) – 29.20 seconds (2014 Guinness World Records, Italy) This performance was more than 2 seconds faster than the WR, but it was disqualified due to a +0.1 second false start
 Captains of Crush grippers – No. 3
 IronMind Block (grip) – 
 IronMind Hub (grip) – 
 Barbell plate pinching – 11 consecutive flipping pinches in 19 seconds
 Cast iron bar bending – 4 x iron rods (each with a  inch (1.6 cm) diameter) bent in 30 seconds (around the neck position)

- Hafþór is also the only man in history to have both a 1,000 lb Squat and a 1,100 lb Deadlift. He has also Deadlifted 1,000 lb or more: 13 times, more than anyone in history.

References

Strongmen competitions
Bjornsson, Hafthor Julius